Louis Mélennec de Beyre (born 18 March 1941, Guilvinec, Finistère) is a French lawyer, doctor, singer, and historian, writing and performing as Louis Mélennec. He is active in Breton nationalism.

Books and CDs 
 Louis Mélennec de Beyre and Lorenzo Cipriani : Chants religieux et traditionnels bretons (audio CD in Breton).

External links
 Louis Mélennec – official site
 Mélennec on FedExt PB
 Lumière 101
 Mémoire de DEA on the union between Brittany and France

1941 births
Living people
People from Finistère
20th-century French historians
20th-century French  lawyers
20th-century French physicians
Breton historians
Breton nationalists
French male singers
French male non-fiction writers